Lo Yu-wei (born 4 July 1969) is a Taiwanese judoka. He competed in the men's half-middleweight event at the 1996 Summer Olympics.

References

1969 births
Living people
Taiwanese male judoka
Olympic judoka of Taiwan
Judoka at the 1996 Summer Olympics
Place of birth missing (living people)
Asian Games medalists in judo
Judoka at the 1994 Asian Games
Asian Games bronze medalists for Chinese Taipei
Medalists at the 1994 Asian Games
20th-century Taiwanese people